Vladimir Núñez Zarabaza (born March 15, 1975) is a Cuban former Major League Baseball relief pitcher. He is currently the pitching coach for the Gulf Coast League Braves of the Gulf Coast League. He played for the Arizona Diamondbacks, Florida Marlins, Colorado Rockies, and Atlanta Braves.

Professional career

Atlanta Braves
On July 7, the Atlanta Braves purchased Núñez's contract from Triple-A Richmond after pitchers Manny Acosta and Jeff Bennett were placed on the disabled list. He made his Braves debut and first major league appearance since  that night against the Los Angeles Dodgers, tossing a scoreless eighth inning with one strikeout. He re-signed with the Braves on November 25, 2008.

On October 12, 2009 the Atlanta Braves outrighted Núñez to the Gwinnett Braves and he elected free agency.

Coaching career
Núñez retired following the 2010 season and accepted the role of pitching coach for the Gulf Coast League Braves.

See also

List of baseball players who defected from Cuba

References

External links

Cuban Play (Series Nacionales)

1975 births
Living people
Águilas del Zulia players
Albuquerque Isotopes players
Arizona Diamondbacks players
Atlanta Braves players
Calgary Cannons players
Cardenales de Lara players
Cuban expatriate baseball players in Venezuela
Charlotte Knights players
Colorado Rockies players
Colorado Springs Sky Sox players
Defecting Cuban baseball players
Estrellas Orientales players
Cuban expatriate baseball players in the Dominican Republic
Florida Marlins players
Gwinnett Braves players
High Desert Mavericks players
Indianapolis Indians players
Industriales de La Habana players
Kane County Cougars players
Lethbridge Black Diamonds players
Major League Baseball pitchers
Major League Baseball players from Cuba
Cuban expatriate baseball players in the United States
Mayos de Navojoa players
Memphis Redbirds players
Oklahoma RedHawks players
Richmond Braves players
Baseball players from Havana
Tucson Sidewinders players
Visalia Oaks players
Cuban expatriate baseball players in Canada
Cuban expatriate baseball players in Mexico